The 2023 World Baseball Classic Pool C was the third of four pools of the 2023 World Baseball Classic that took place from March 11–15 at Chase Field in Phoenix, Arizona. The Pool C winner and runner up, Mexico and United States advanced to the Quarterfinals 2 round, as well as the Pool D winner and runner up. The Quarterfinals 2 round will be played March 17–18, 2023 in Miami. The teams in this pool consisted of Canada, Colombia, newcomer Great Britain, Mexico, and hosts and defending champions United States.

After starting with a loss to Colombia, Mexico bounced back with three straight wins over the United States, Great Britain and Canada to advance to the quarterfinals as pool winners. The U.S. and Colombia played the last game of the pool, a Colombia win would force a three-way tie which could also favor Canada depending on tiebreakers. The U.S. won 3–2 to advance. Colombia fell to 1–3, tying with Great Britain, but as they lost the head-to-head game, Colombia was relegated to the 2026 World Baseball Classic qualifiers.

Teams

Standings

Summary

|}

Matches

Colombia vs Mexico

Great Britain vs United States

Great Britain vs Canada

Mexico vs United States

Colombia vs Great Britain

Canada vs United States

Canada vs Colombia

Great Britain vs Mexico

Mexico vs Canada

United States vs Colombia

Statistics

Source:

Leading hitters

Power

Efficiency

Leading pitchers

References

Pool C
World Baseball Classic Pool C
2020s in Phoenix, Arizona
Baseball competitions in Phoenix, Arizona
International baseball competitions hosted by the United States
World Baseball Classic Pool C